Jeremy Gucassoff is a Belgian international field hockey player raised in Brussels. His pitch position is goalkeeper. In 2011, he was elected  Goalie of the Year by Hockey Belgium.

Gucassoff became European vice-champion with Belgium Red Lions.

References

Living people
Belgian male field hockey players
Field hockey players from Brussels
Year of birth missing (living people)
2014 Men's Hockey World Cup players